The Texas Hill Country is a geographic region of Central and South Texas, forming the southeast part of the Edwards Plateau. Given its location, climate, terrain, and vegetation, the Hill Country can be considered the border between the American Southeast and Southwest. The region represents the very remote rural countryside of Central Texas, but also is home to growing suburban neighborhoods and affluent retirement communities.

The region is notable for its karst topography and tall rugged hills of limestone or granite. The Hill Country also includes the Llano Uplift and the second-largest granite dome in the United States, Enchanted Rock. The terrain throughout the region is characterized by a thin layer of topsoil and many exposed rocks and boulders, making the region very dry and prone to flash flooding. Native vegetation in the region includes various yucca, prickly pear cactus, desert spoon, and wildflowers in the Llano Uplift. The predominant trees in the region are Ashe juniper and Texas live oak.

Bound on the east by the Balcones Escarpment, the Hill Country reaches into the far northern portions of San Antonio and the western portions of Travis County including the cities of Austin and Lago Vista. As a result of springs discharging water stored in the Edwards Aquifer, several cities such as Austin, San Marcos, and New Braunfels were settled at the base of the Balcones Escarpment. , the region's economy was one of the fastest growing in the United States.

Counties
According to the Texas Parks and Wildlife Department, these 25 counties are included in the Hill Country Wildlife District:

History and politics
During the American Civil War, due to its large, pro-Union, German immigrant population, the Texas Hill Country was opposed to Texas seceding from the Union. Subsequently, in the three quarters of a century following Reconstruction, the core of the Hill Country generally provided the solitary support base for the Republican Party in what became a one-party Democratic state.

Even when no Republicans were in the Texas Legislature during the 1930s and 1940s, Gillespie and Kendall Counties backed every Republican Presidential nominee barring Herbert Hoover’s failed 1932 re-election campaign, and Republicans continued to control local government. Guadalupe and Comal Counties were less Republican, but still did not vote for Democratic nominees outside the 1912, 1932, 1936, and 1964 landslides. The region was also the only one in antebellum slave states to back the insurgent candidacy of Robert La Follette in 1924; in fact, Comal was La Follette’s top county in the nation with 73.96% of the vote, and Gillespie and Comal were the only counties south of the Mason–Dixon line to give a plurality to his “Progressive” ticket.

Geography
Because of its karst topography, the area also features a number of caverns, such as Inner Space Caverns, Natural Bridge Caverns, Bracken Cave, Longhorn Cavern State Park, Cascade Caverns, Caverns of Sonora and Cave Without a Name. The deeper caverns of the area form several aquifers, which serve as a source of drinking water for its residents. Wonder Cave in San Marcos was formed by an earthquake along the Balcones Fault. From east to west, Texas Hill Country is where the Southern United States ends and the Southwestern United States begins.  

Several tributaries of the Colorado River in Texas — including the Llano and Pedernales Rivers, which cross the region west to east and join the Colorado as it cuts across the region to the southeast – drain a large portion of the Hill Country. The Guadalupe, San Antonio, Frio, Medina, and Nueces Rivers originate in the Hill Country.

This region is a dividing line for certain species occurrence. For example, the California fan palm (Washingtonia filifera) is the only species of palm tree that is native to the continental United States west of the Hill Country's Balcones Fault.

The region has hot summers, particularly in July and August, and even the nighttime temperatures remain high, as the elevation is modest despite the hilly terrain. Winter temperatures are sometimes as much as 10°F cooler than in other parts of Texas to the east.

In popular culture
The area experiences a fusion of Spanish and German influences in food, beer, architecture, and music that form a distinctively "Texan" culture separate from the state's Southern and Southwestern influences. For example, the accordion was popularized in Tejano music in the 19th century due to cultural exposure to German settlers.

Devil's Backbone is an elevated, winding stretch of Ranch Road 12 between San Marcos and Wimberley, then Ranch Road 32 continuing through to Blanco. It has long been the subject of ghost stories. Folklore about it appeared in a 1996 episode of NBC's Robert Stack anthology series Unsolved Mysteries, featuring apparitional Spanish monks, Comanche and Lipan Apache tribes, Confederate soldiers on their horses, and a spirit of a wolf. It later reaired when this series was hosted by Dennis Farina.

The region has emerged as the center of the Texas wine industry. Three American Viticultural Areas are located in the areas: Texas Hill Country AVA, Fredericksburg in the Texas Hill Country AVA, and Bell Mountain AVA.

The Hill Country is also known for its tourism. In 2008, The New York Times listed the Hill Country in an article about North American vacation destinations. Hill Country has also made Texas a popular retirement destination in the United States. The region has attracted Baby Boomers as they near retirement age.

Frederick Day, a demographer with Texas State University, said in 2008 that the Hill Country lifestyle reminds one of the small towns of the recent past. "Like old America . . . [the] cost of living is pretty low. To people who have spent their work life in Houston or Dallas, the Hill Country is very attractive."

Notable people

See also
Adelsverein
Balcones Canyonlands National Wildlife Refuge
Cherry Springs Dance Hall
German Texan
List of geographical regions in Texas
Mount Bonnell
Revolutions of 1848
Enchanted Rock

References

External links

 Boerne Directory "Heart of The Hill Country"

 
Regions of Texas
Hill lands
German-American history
Geography of Bandera County, Texas
Geography of Bell County, Texas
Geography of Blanco County, Texas
Geography of Burnet County, Texas
Geography of Comal County, Texas
Geography of Coryell County, Texas
Geography of Crockett County, Texas
Geography of Edwards County, Texas
Geography of Gillespie County, Texas
Geography of Hays County, Texas
Geography of Kendall County, Texas
Geography of Kerr County, Texas
Geography of Kimble County, Texas
Geography of Lampasas County, Texas
Geography of Llano County, Texas
Geography of Mason County, Texas
Geography of McCulloch County, Texas
Geography of Menard County, Texas
Geography of Real County, Texas
Geography of San Saba County, Texas
Geography of Schleicher County, Texas
Geography of Sutton County, Texas
Geography of Travis County, Texas
Geography of Val Verde County, Texas
Geography of Williamson County, Texas